Thomas J. (Tom) Schriber (born Oct. 28. 1935) is an American academic, and Professor of Technology and Operations at the Ross School of Business. He is particularly known for his work on "Simulation using General Purpose Simulation System (GPSS)."

Biography 
Born in Flint, Michigan, Schriber obtained his MS at the University of Notre Dame in 1957, and then moved to the University of Michigan, where he obtained in MSE in 1958, his MA in 1959, and his PhD in 1964.

Schriber started his academic career at the Eastern Michigan University in 1963 as Assistant Professor and also became Director of its Academic Computer Center. In 1966 he moved to the University of Michigan, where he was appointed Assistant Professor. In 1969 he became Associate Professor, in 1972 Professor of Business Information Technology. He was Visiting Scholar at the Stanford University in 1972-73, at the Swiss Federal Technical University in 1995, and at the National University of Singapore in 1995.

Schriber was awarded by INFORMS the Simulation Society’s Distinguished Service Award, and its Lifetime Professional Achievement Award.

Schriber lives in Ann Arbor, MI with his wife Ann Schriber. They've been married since 1967 and have three kids: Sarah Schriber of Oak Park, Il, John Schriber of Louisville, KY, and Maria Schriber of Los Angeles, CA.

Work 
Schriber's research interests are in the field of "discrete-event simulation, which is a methodology for building computer-based models of systems and then conducting experiments with the models to make inferences about the behavior of the systems being modeled." According to Schriber (2014)
Simulation encompasses a broad set of activities, including 
 the design and implementation of modeling languages; 
 the verification and validation of models; 
 the visualization of systems through the animation of models; 
 the analysis of input (data) to simulation models; 
 statistical design of experiments; 
 statistical analysis of output; 
 the education of simulation modelers and simulation consumers; and 
 the effective “selling” of simulation results to high-level decision makers. 
Within this broad arena, some of my activities include or have included: the logical foundations of simulation software; the implementation of variance-reduction techniques in the design of models; simulation applications in the design and control of manufacturing and transportation systems; automation of output analysis; automatic model generation; the writing of simulation textbooks; and the use of Web-based tools in simulation education. 
Simulation can be used "to design complex systems that are not amenable to mathematical analysis, such as manufacturing systems, logistics systems, and information systems."

Selected publications 
 Schriber, Thomas J. Fundamentals of flowcharting. (1969).
 McMillan, Claude, and Richard F. Gonzalez. Systems analysis: a computer approach to decision models. Richard D. Irwin, 1973.
 Schriber, Thomas J. Simulation using GPSS. Michigan Univ. Ann Arbor, 1974.

Articles, a selection:
 Schriber, Thomas J. "Introduction to simulation." Proceedings of the 9th conference on Winter simulation-Volume 1. Winter Simulation Conference, 1977.
 Schriber, Thomas J., Daniel T. Brunner, and Jeffrey S. Smith. "Inside discrete-event simulation software: how it works and why it matters." Proceedings of the 2013 Winter Simulation Conference: Simulation: Making Decisions in a Complex World. IEEE Press, 2013.

References

External links 
 Tom Schriber | Michigan Ross
 Thomas J. Schriber, Ph.D. - Computer Simulation Archive
 Guide to the Thomas J. Schriber Collection 1968-2010

1935 births
Living people
21st-century American engineers
American business theorists
University of Notre Dame alumni
University of Michigan College of Engineering alumni
University of Michigan faculty
People from Flint, Michigan